Darwin Crater is a suspected meteorite impact crater in Western Tasmania about  south of Queenstown, just within the Franklin-Gordon Wild Rivers National Park. The crater is expressed as a rimless circular flat-floored depression,  in diameter, within mountainous and heavily forested terrain. It is east of the West Coast Range and the former North Mount Lyell Railway formation.

Discovery and description
Although definitive proof of an impact origin of the crater is lacking, the impact hypothesis is strongly supported by the relationship of the glass to the crater, as well as the stratigraphy and deformation of the crater-filling material.

If the crater is indeed the source of the glass, the age of Darwin Crater is 816,000 ± 7,000 years—the age of Darwin glass as determined by argon–argon dating method.

Carbonaceous inclusions have been found for the first time in Darwin glass:  these have been shown to be biomarkers which survived the Darwin impact and are representative of plant species in the local ecosystem—including cellulose, lignin, aliphatic biopolymer and protein remnants.

Drilling

Various projects have drilled at the site.
In 2007, Howard and Haines reported on their research.
In 2018, the sediments in the crater were drilled and investigated.

Access

While there was a trail leading to the crater in the 1970s, accounts note that it is unmaintained, overgrown and boggy in places.

Gallery

See also

 List of impact craters in Australia
 Protected areas of Tasmania

References

External links
 Tasmania Parks & Wildlife Service

Further reading

Impact craters of Tasmania
Pleistocene impact craters
Pleistocene Australia
Western Tasmania